Gampo-eup is an eup or a town of Gyeongju in South Korea. It contains part of Gyeongju National Park: the Daebon section which covers the shoreline near Daewangnueng, the watery grave of King Munmu of the Silla kingdom. 7,132 people live in Gampo-eup, served by two elementary schools and a joint middle-high school. Important local products include persimmons as well as anchovies, seaweed, and squid.

There are over 240 seafood restaurants in Gampo Harbor offering various dishes made with seafood caught in the sea, such as hoe (raw fish dishes), jeonboktang (an abalone soup), grilled seafood and others.

See also
Subdivisions of Gyeongju
Administrative divisions of South Korea

References

External links
 The official site of Gampo-eup

Subdivisions of Gyeongju
Towns and townships in North Gyeongsang Province